A master mix is a mixture containing precursors and enzymes used as an ingredient in RT-PCR techniques in molecular biology. Such mixtures contain a mixture dNTPs (required as a substrate for the building of new DNA strands), MgCl2, Taq polymerase (an enzyme required to building new DNA strands), a pH buffer and come mixed in nuclease-free water.

Master mixes for real-time PCR include a fluorescent compound (frequently SYBR green), and the choice of mix also influence test sensitivity and consistency.

Differences in the choice of master mixes can sometimes explain difference in experimental results, a particular case being the measurement of telomere length.

References

DNA sequencing